Club Deportivo Corralejo is a Spanish football club based in Corralejo, Fuerteventura, in the autonomous community of the Canary Islands. Founded on 1 June 2005 it currently plays in Primera Regional de Aficionados – Fuerteventura, holding home matches at Estadio Vicente Carreño Alonso, which holds 2,000 spectators.

History
The club was founded in 2005 as Unión Deportiva Corralejo Baku in the aftermath of the merger between Club Deportivo Fuerteventura and Club Deportivo Corralejo, which formed Unión Deportiva Fuerteventura. If first reached Tercera División in 2009–10, finishing the regular season in first position but falling short in the promotion playoffs.

The first team had to withdraw for the 2013–14 Tercera División, due to lack of funding, but the club remained active by playing only youth tournaments. They played for one season (2017–18) in the Primera Regional de Aficionados before permanently returning with first team activities in 2019.

Season to season

4 seasons in Tercera División

References

External links
Official website 
Futbolme team profile 

Football clubs in the Canary Islands
Association football clubs established in 2005
Fuerteventura
2005 establishments in Spain